Allophorocera is a genus of flies in the family Tachinidae.

Species
A. aldrichi (Curran, 1927)
A. arator (Aldrich, 1925)
A. australis (Coquillett, 1897)
A. celeris (Coquillett, 1897)
A. chaetosa (Townsend, 1926)
A. cinerea (Chao & Liang), 1982
A. delecta (Curran, 1927)
A. ferruginea (Meigen, 1824)
A. flavipruina (Chao & Liang), 1982
A. flavitarsa (Reinhard, 1934)
A. lapponica Wood, 1974
A. occidentalis (Coquillett, 1897)
A. pachystyla (Macquart, 1850)
A. picata (Reinhard, 1953)
A. ruficornis (Smith, 1917)
A. rufipes (Brauer & von Bergenstamm, 1891)
A. rutila (Meigen, 1824)
A. sajanica Mesnil, 1963
A. sectilis (Reinhard, 1953)
A. varifrons (Curran, 1927)

References

Tachinidae genera
Exoristinae
Taxa named by Friedrich Georg Hendel